Sand Creek may refer to a location in the United States:

Communities
 Sand Creek, Guyana, a village in Guyana
 Sand Creek, Oklahoma, in Grant County
 Sand Creek, Wisconsin, a town
 Sand Creek (community), Wisconsin, an unincorporated community within the town of Sand Creek
 Sand Creek Township (disambiguation)

Streams
 Sand Creek (Denver, Colorado), a tributary of the South Platte River flowing through Aurora, Denver, and Commerce City, Colorado
 Sand Creek (Colorado Springs, Colorado), a tributary of Fountain Creek
 Sand Creek (Wyoming), a tributary of the Laramie River and a National Natural Landmark
 Sand Creek, (San Bernardino County, California), a tributary of Warm Creek, a tributary of Lytle Creek
 Sand Creek (San Diego County, California), a tributary of the San Diego River
 Sand Creek (St. Croix River), in Pine County, eastern Minnesota
 Sand Creek (Minnesota River), in Le Sueur and Scott counties, Minnesota
 Sand Creek (Tebo Creek), a stream in Missouri
 Sand Creek (Wolf Creek), a stream in Missouri
 Sand Creek (Niobrara River tributary), a stream in Holt County, Nebraska
 Sand Creek (Willow Creek tributary), a stream in Rock County, Nebraska
 Big Sandy Creek (Colorado), site of the Sand Creek Massacre
 Big Sandy Creek (Montana), also known as Sand Creek

Other uses
 Sand Creek High School in Colorado Springs, Colorado, USA
 Sand Creek Massacre National Historic Site, Colorado, USA
 Sand Creek Massacre in southeastern Colorado Territory, USA in 1864
 Sand Creek Natural Area, a protected area in Larimer County, Colorado, USA